Oscar Jose Corral (born 16 August 1974) is a Cuban-American journalist and filmmaker. In 2012, Corral directed and produced a documentary film, Tom Wolfe Gets Back to Blood, which enjoyed a national run on PBS and was screened in more than 40 independent theaters around the country. It is the only film ever made about Tom Wolfe, an iconic author and satirist whose stature in American letters has loomed large for the last half century. The film is about how Wolfe researched his Miami-set novel, Back to Blood, in South Florida.

Through his own media production company, Explica Media Solutions, Corral has partnered with, and worked for, many news organizations, including the Miami Herald, which premiered an 18-part video series about invasive Burmese pythons in 2014. That series, later rebranded Exotic Invaders: Pythons in the Everglades, premiered on PBS nationally in 2015 and is available on Netflix. The film won an Emmy award for environmental films. Corral also completed a documentary film about undocumented child immigrants, The Crossfire Kids, in 2014. That film aired on South Florida PBS affiliate WPBT2 and received an Emmy nomination.

Corral is a former Miami Herald journalist who triggered a firestorm among Cuban exiles in Miami with his reporting about government funding for Radio and TV Marti and other U.S. government programs to promote democracy in Cuba. His controversial stories have been the subject of several studies and analyses, most recently by Columbia University, which used them as a basis for an ethical case study.

Corral also played major roles in the coverage of other big stories in Miami, including the fall of Miami Commissioner Arthur Teele, the case of Cuban exile militant Luis Posada Carriles, and multiple state and national political campaigns. His short-lived blog, Miami's Cuban Connection, enjoyed a burst of popularity in 2006 before fading into internet limbo, where it lives on in the Miami Herald's archives. It has not been updated for several years.

Biography 
Corral is the 2nd child of Oscar Jose Corral-Corral and Maria Caridad Parlade y Fernandez de Castro, Cuban exiles. He graduated in 1992 from Belen Jesuit Preparatory School in Miami.

Corral later graduated from the University of Florida's journalism program, and won first place in the Hearst National Writing Awards in 1998 with an article about the budding medical marijuana scene in San Francisco that year.

After winning the Hearst award, The Chicago Tribune recruited Corral for an internship at the storied newspaper. While working in Tribune tower, Corral researched and broke several stories, including an in-depth scoop on a legal fight over the estate of Beat Generation Author and Poet, Jack Kerouac. Titled "Fighting Over Jack", the article reported that Kerouac's estate was worth just $91 at the time of his death, but had grown to be valued at more than $10 million, triggering a legal struggle for control.

After completing his master's degree in International Relations at Florida International University, Corral moved to New York City to work for Newsday, where he covered crime for the Pulitzer-prize winning tabloid.

While at Newsday, Corral worked on several high-profile stories, including the case of Reyna Angelica Marroquin, a Salvadoran immigrant to New York who disappeared in 1969. Her mummified body was discovered inside a metal drum below a Long Island mansion 30 years later. Corral reported on the importance of science and technology in breaking the case, turning the heads of television producers looking to recreate true-crime stories on television. Corral was the first to find the woman's family in El Salvador and break the news to them about her death. The story made national headlines and Forensic Files made a documentary on the case, where Corral appears in an interview. The case was also featured on 48 Hours and became the backdrop for an episode of Law & Order.

Corral returned to his native Miami in 2001, just weeks before the September 11 attacks, and was quickly assigned to the story's Florida angle by his new employer, The Miami Herald. He and a team of other journalists won a Green Eyeshade Award from the Society of Professional Journalists for their coverage of the terrorists' movements in Florida in the weeks leading up to the attacks.

His first beat was Miami City Hall, where the mayoral campaign immediately following the Elian Gonzalez fiasco was in full swing. Incumbent Joe Carollo was defeated by Manny Diaz, a local lawyer who had represented Elian's Miami relatives. Corral's coverage of City Hall culminated with a series of investigative articles about Miami Commissioner Arthur Teele. Teele was eventually indicted on federal and state corruption charges and shot himself to death in the lobby of the Miami Herald building. Corral appears in a documentary on Teele's rise and fall, Miami Noir.

Corral covered the 2003-2004 presidential primary of Connecticut Senator Joseph Lieberman, following Al Gore's former running mate for months as he combed New Hampshire and other early-voting states pining for votes. He also covered the failed gubernatorial campaign of former U.S. Attorney General Janet Reno, and the failed campaign of presidential hopeful Rudy Giuliani in Florida in 2008.

In 2005, Corral and several colleagues drove an RV packed with supplies to Biloxi, and then on to New Orleans in the immediate aftermath of Hurricane Katrina. Corral spent a week living in the destroyed Radisson downtown with other journalists, covering the unrest and chaos that followed the historic storm.

Corral was eventually asked to cover the contentious Cuban exile politics beat and launched a blog called Miami's Cuban Connection, which grew steadily in popularity until 2007, when Corral moved on to another beat. He covered the story of Luis Posada Carriles, a Cuban exile militant and accused terrorist who slipped past Homeland Security to sneak into Miami in 2005. Corral and colleague Alfonso Chardy were the first journalists in the United States to find and interview Posada on American Soil. Posada was arrested by federal authorities soon after and has been in federal detention since then. Posada has been accused of masterminding the bombing of a Cuban passenger jet in 1976, which killed 74 people, including several children. Corral and Chardy were awarded first place in the Sunshine State awards for their reporting on the Posada story. The Miami Herald nominated the duo for a Pulitzer Prize that year.

In September 2006, Corral published what would become the most controversial investigative article of his career. It unleashed a firestorm in the Cuban exile community and turned Corral into a target for death threats, slander and undaunted libel. According to Columbia University Professor Kirsten Lundberg, who turned the case into a 30-page journalism ethics case study, the event can be used to discuss strategic management at both an editorial and ownership level. "Students can gain understanding of the relationship between newspaper owners, their publishers and their editors. The case also raises for discussion ethnic issues in the newsroom. How should managers approach ethnic diversity in a newsroom if that becomes a tripwire for anger and hostility."

According to Lundberg

"On September 8, 2006, the Miami Herald ran a Page One story titled “10 Miami journalists take U.S. pay.” The story by Oscar Corral reported that Miami-area journalists had accepted money from Radio/TV Martí, a US government-run broadcast targeted at the communist nation of Cuba. Three of the 11 journalists named in the story worked for El Nuevo Herald, a Spanish-language newspaper also owned by the Miami Herald Publishing Company. Corral wrote that the three had been fired for violating conflict of interest rules.

"The story, and the disciplinary action, unleashed a firestorm of protest from Cuban-Americans and others in greater Miami. Over a thousand readers canceled their subscriptions. The accused at Nuevo Herald protested that they had permission from a previous editor to work at Radio Martí. Those accused who did not work for Nuevo Herald wondered why the Miami Herald story had cast as reprehensible a practice which they regarded as professionally unremarkable, and also a moral duty. Charges of racism and anti-Cuban prejudice raced through the Cuban-American community and fetched headlines elsewhere.

"Miami Herald publisher Jesús Díaz, Jr., held ultimate responsibility for both newspapers. He had made the decision to fire the three Nuevo Herald reporters. As criticism mounted, he came in for scathing critique within both the Nuevo Herald and—to the surprise of some—the Miami Herald newsrooms. On September 15, nationally recognized Miami Herald columnist Carl Hiaasen submitted for publication a column about the Radio Martí incident in which, Díaz felt, Hiaasen made light of the situation. Fearing more backlash, Díaz spiked the column. Hiaasen protested, and threatened to resign.

"The McClatchy Company had bought the Knight-Ridder newspaper chain, with its crown jewel, the Miami Herald, just three months earlier. Headquartered in Sacramento, California, McClatchy rarely interfered in the running of its properties. But when news of the Hiaasen stand-off reached Vice President for News Howard Weaver, he intervened. Hiaasen’s column, he ruled, would run—and it appeared in its regularly scheduled slot on September 17."

In the days following the controversy, Corral received multiple death threats on himself and his family. The Miami Herald reportedly moved Corral and his family into a secure location with 24-hour security for two months. Corral continued working on investigative stories on how the United States government was spending hundreds of millions of dollars in taxpayer money to promote democracy in Cuba. From September through December of that year, Corral published another 5 investigative articles on the topic. They ultimately led to the departure of USAID's Cuba program director. A TV Marti executive was also indicted on corruption charges in the aftermath of the articles. Much of the money was flowing into local media organizations, and never made it to Cuba. Corral was targeted by many on local Spanish-language radio and television with insults and as Miami Herald editor Tom Fiedler put it at the time, "blood libel."

During his years as a journalist at the Miami Herald, Corral twice made the Miami New Times’ annual “Best Of Miami” edition. In 2004, he reported the “Best Quote,” which was attributed to Miami Police Chief John Timoney. It reads: “It's always threat-level orange when John Timoney opens his mouth. But this inspired utterance, issued while he was on a bike tour of the anti-free-trade protest zone in downtown Miami this past November, rocketed the churlish chief well into the red zone. Perhaps he was drunk from the $8.5 million the Department of Homeland Security allotted the Magic City police force to fend off opponents of the Free Trade Association of the Americas. "You're bad. Fuck you!" he yelled at a young male demonstrator as undercover cops shoved the lad against a car to arrest him. Scrappy Miami Herald reporter Oscar Corral, who was bicycle-embedded with Timoney when he snagged the quote, slammed it into the lead sentence of his story, right where it belonged. Timoney later denied saying "You're bad," insisting that he doesn't talk like that. But he may have blurted the "Fuck you" part, he allowed with a chuckle. The prudish daily softened the f-word to "f---" on the printed page, but that didn't keep this quote from ricocheting into a revealing metaphor of the man Miami pays to keep the peace.”

In 2007, Corral was named by Miami New Times as “Best Commie Agent”, an ironic allusion to the extensive slander and libel that befell Corral following his investigations of how the U.S. government was misspending hundreds of millions of taxpayer dollars to promote democracy in Cuba. It reads: “That damn Oscar Corral. First he writes a story informing Miami residents that ten South Florida journalists are on the payrolls of U.S. propaganda vehicles Radio and TV Martí. Then he has the nerve to tell us that none of the $55.5 million in taxpayer money intended to fund Cuban dissidents has reached the island in cash. Instead the bulk was spent in Miami and Washington, or on exorbitant bills to ship goods to the island. And then he reports that most of that local spending was done without oversight or competitive bidding, and that the goods purchased for anti-Castro activists to foster democracy included Nintendo Game Boys, a chainsaw, Sony PlayStations, cashmere sweaters, a mountain bike, Godiva chocolates, and crabmeat. He may have been leaking fecal matter and stuffed with tubes, but there was only one man behind this, and he wears an Adidas track jacket and has a beard. Thank God for the freelance columnist at El Nuevo Herald, Nicolas Perez Diaz-Arguelles, who finally put two and two together and took the leap of faith to insinuate what was on all of our minds: Oscar Corral is a Cuban spy. The writer's editor may have cried "blood libel," but when it comes down to it, newspapers are irrelevant to a democracy. Eating truffles while playing Grand Theft Auto, That's a slap in Castro's face.”

Corral remained silent during most of the controversy, and focused instead on completing the multi-part investigative series. Eventually, he granted an interview to fellow Miami journalist Rebecca Wakefield, a former New Times writer who was working for the SunPost. The article, titled "I Am Not A Communist", explains: "Oscar Corral dreamed of one day being hired by the Miami Herald. He never imagined it would come with an existential crisis." Instead of lashing out at critics, Corral struck a humble tone, saying that his deep community roots in Miami made him sensitive to the Cuban exile community's passionate outlook on Cuba. "Corral, 32, is soft-spoken, thoughtful and earnest to a fault. He still looks like a Catholic school boy and has an almost ecclesiastical approach to journalism," Wakefield wrote. In the interview, Corral revealed that The Miami Herald had moved him and his family out of his house as a precaution following a series of death threats.

Corral left the Miami Herald in 2008 to launch a multimedia production company. His first major project was the Wolfe documentary, Tom Wolfe Gets Back to Blood. He is now working on a documentary about the role immigrants have played in Miami.

References

American male journalists
Living people
1974 births
University of Florida alumni
Florida International University alumni